Kayleigh Hines (born 27 February 1991) is an English footballer who plays as a midfielder for Loughborough Lightning She previously played for Reading.

Early life
Hines began playing football at age 8 and eventually joined a local boys' team where she played until the age of 12. She then joined the Reading F.C.'s Centre of Excellence. As a teenager, Hines played for Arsenal Academy and St Albans.  At the age of 18, she travelled to New Jersey in the United States where she played for Women's Premier Soccer League (WPSL) side Millburn Magic. Named to the WPSL's All-East First Team in 2010, Hines also coached the Millburn Magic Under-9 summer select team.

Playing career

Oxford United, 2014–2015 
Hines signed with Oxford United in the FAWSL 2 for the league's inaugural season. In June 2014, she scored a goal from 40 yards out against Durham helping Reading win 2–1. Oxford finished the regular season in ninth place with a  record. Hines made 22 appearances for the club and scored two goals during the 2014 season.

Returning for the 2015 season, Hines scored a brace against Reading leading Oxford United to a draw in April. She finished the season with seven goals in 17 appearances. Oxford United finished sixth in the season.

Reading FC, 2016– 
In December 2015, it was announced that Hines had signed a professional contract with  Reading F.C. in FA WSL 1. Of her signing, Reading manager Kelly Chambers said, 'I have known of Kayleigh's ability for a long time. It's great to get her signature on the dotted line, she will bring a different dimension to our team that maybe we have been lacking previously."

References

External links

 Reading player profile 
 

Living people
1991 births
English women's footballers
Women's association football midfielders
Women's Super League players
Reading F.C. Women players
Oxford United W.F.C. players